Folk-Legacy Records was an independent record label specializing in traditional and contemporary folk music of the English-speaking world. It was founded in 1961 by Sandy and Caroline Paton and Lee Baker Haggerty.

The label recorded Frank Proffitt and released a memorial album after his passing. Folk-Legacy has produced more than 120 recordings. Recording and cover photographs were done by Sandy Paton while Haggerty was the business manager. Sandy and Caroline were singers in their own right, having been designated the Connecticut State Troubadours for 1993–1994. They lived in Sharon, Connecticut until Sandy's death in 2009.

In 2019, the label's collection was transferred to Smithsonian Folkways.

Early years

Master List / Discography

See also
 List of record labels

References

External links
 Official site

American independent record labels
Record labels established in 1961
Folk record labels
Sharon, Connecticut